Audrey Amiel (born 3 March 1987) is a French rugby sevens player. She was selected as a member of the France women's national rugby sevens team to the 2016 Summer Olympics.

She is a Firefighter by profession.

References

External links 
 
 
 
 

1987 births
Living people
Female rugby sevens players
Rugby sevens players at the 2016 Summer Olympics
French female rugby union players
Olympic rugby sevens players of France
France international rugby sevens players
France international women's rugby sevens players